Sanford A. Brown (May 18, 1909June 26, 1986) was a Michigan politician.

Early life
Brown was born in Bay Port, Michigan on May 18, 1909.

Career
Brown served as Michigan State Treasurer from 1955 to 1965. Brown was the last Michigan State Treasurer to be elected, as the position was changed to an appointed one after his term in the office. In 1956 and 1964, Brown served as an alternate delegate to the Democratic National Convention from Michigan. In 1964, Brown ran unsuccessfully as for the United States House of Representatives seat representing the Michigan's 8th congressional district. In 1968, Brown ran unsuccessfully for the Michigan House of Representatives seat representing the 57th district.

Personal life
Brown married Mildred Maxine Harder. Together they had two sons.

Death
Brown died on June 26, 1986 in Bay City. Brown was interred at New Bay Port Cemetery in Fairhaven Township, Michigan.

References

1909 births
1986 deaths
Burials in Michigan
Politicians from Bay City, Michigan
State treasurers of Michigan
Michigan Democrats
20th-century American politicians